Thumata (Greek: Θουμάτα, Thoumata), or Thamatha, was an Arabian town of classical antiquity.

History 
Thumata was a town of Arabia Felix, according to Ptolemy, and described by Pliny as distant ten days' sail from Petra, and subject to the king of the Characeni.

References

Sources 

 Dyer, Thomas H. (1857). "Thumata". In Smith, William (ed.). Dictionary of Greek and Roman Geography. Vol. 2: Iabadius–Zymethus. London: Walton and Maberly. p. 1191. 

Ancient cities